Muhammad Afzal bin Akbar (born 2 November 1998) is a Malaysian professional footballer who plays for Malaysia Super League club Kelantan as a midfielder.

Early life and career

Afzal started his career with the Kuala Lumpur President and Youth Cup squad before continuing his studies at UiTM Shah Alam in the field of Sports Science.

Senior career

Kelantan
On 25 February 2023, Afzal made his debut for the club in a 1-2 defeat against Kuching City.

Style of play

Afzal can operate as a midfielder or left-back.

Career statistics

Club

References

External links 

1998 births
Living people
Association football midfielders
Malaysian footballers
Malaysia Super League players
UiTM FC players
Kelantan F.C. players